"California"  is a song by American recording artist Usher. It features American rapper Tyga. It was released on June 15, 2020, following Usher's appearance on an episode of the television series Songland. The song was written by Usher, Tyga, Ester Dean, Ryan Tedder, Shane McAnally, Ryan Cambetes, Melvin Hough Ii, Rivelino Raoul Wouter, Kaj Nelson Blokhuis, and Michael Wise.

Background
Usher appeared on the season finale of the second season of American songwriting competition series, Songland, which aired June 15, 2020.

Music video
The music video was released on June 18, 2020.

Release history

Charts

References

2020 songs
Usher (musician) songs
Tyga songs
RCA Records singles
Songs about California
Songs written by Usher (musician)
Songs written by Tyga
Songs written by Ester Dean
Songs written by Shane McAnally
Songs written by Ryan Tedder
Songs written by Mike Wise (record producer)